Carlos Soto Menegazzo is a Guatemalan politician. He serves as Guatemala's Minister of Public Health and Social Assistance.

References

Living people
Government ministers of Guatemala
Year of birth missing (living people)
Place of birth missing (living people)